This is a list of notable singers from Malaysia.

A
 Adibah Noor
 Adira
 Afdlin Shauki
 Ah Niu
 Ahmad Zamil
 Aiman Hakim Ridza
 Aizat Amdan
 Alif Satar
 Altimet
 Alvin Anthons
 Amy Mastura
 Angelica Lee
 Angeline Khoo
 Anuar Zain
 Aril AF7
 Armando Chin Yong
 Ash Nair
 Awie
 Ayda Jebat
 Azean Irdawaty
 Azmyl Yunor
 Aznil Nawawi

B
 Bell Yu Tian
 Betty Banafe

C
 Camelia
 Cass Chin
 Chan Kwok Fai
 Crystal Ong

C
 Daniel Lee Chee Hun
 David Arumugam
 Dayang Nurfaizah
 Dewi Liana Seriestha

E
 Ella
 Eric Moo
 Erra Fazira
 Esther Applunius

F
 Fairuz Hussein
 Faizal Tahir
 Faradina Mohd. Nadzir
 Farah Asyikin Zulkifli
 Fauziah Latiff
 Fish Leong
 Four Golden Princess
 Francissca Peter
 Freya Lim

G
 Gary Chaw
 Gordon Teoh

H
 Hafiz Suip
 Hafidz Roshdi
 Hannah Tan
 Hunny Madu

I
 Imee Ooi
 Izwan Pilus
 Iqram Dinzly

J
 Jaclyn Victor
 Jamal Abdillah
 Janna Nick
 Jason Lo
 Jess Lee
 Jessie Chung
 Juwita Suwito

K
 Kaer Azami
 Karen Kong

L
 Lin Jian Hui
 Liyana Jasmay
 Liza Hanim
 Loganathan Arumugam

M
 M-Girls
 Marsha Milan Londoh
 Mawi
 Maya Karin
 Meeia Foo
 Meor Aziddin Yusof
 Michael Wong
 Mizz Nina
 Mohd Taufik Nordin

N
 Najwa Latif
 Nana
 Nicholas Teo
 Nikki
 Nina Nadira Naharuddin
 Ning Baizura
 Noraniza Idris
 Noh Salleh

P
 Penny Tai
 Pete Teo
 Prema
 Prema Yin

Q
 Queenz Cheng
 Quincy Tan

R
 Race Wong
 Radhi-O
 Resh
 Remy Ishak
 Riz
 Ronnie Pereira
 Rosanne Wong
 Rosiah Chik
 Rynn Lim

S
 Salmah Ismail
 Sandra Dianne
 Sarimah Ibrahim
 Sean Ghazi
 Shah Indrawan Ismail
 Shahir
 Shake
 Shanon Shah
 Sharifah Aini
 Sheila Majid
 Shi Xin Hui
 Shila Amzah
 SingleTrackMind
 Siti Nurhaliza
 Soo Wincci
 Stacy
 Stella Chung
 Sudirman Arshad
 Suki Low

T
 Tiz Zaqyah

V
 Victor Wong
 Vince Chong

X
 Xin Yan

Y
 Yi Jet Qi
 Yuna

Z
 Zaharah Agus
 Zee Avi
 Ziana Zain

References

 
Lists of singers by nationality
Singers